Cyril Viudes (born 6 February 1982) is a French handball player for KIF Kolding København.

References

1982 births
Living people
People from Champigny-sur-Marne
French male handball players
Expatriate handball players
KIF Kolding players
Sportspeople from Val-de-Marne